The Reason is the second studio album by American rock band Hoobastank, released on December 9, 2003 by Island Records. Produced by Howard Benson, it was the band's last album to feature bassist Markku Lappaleinen prior to his departure in 2005.

Despite receiving mixed reviews from critics, The Reason peaked at number three on the US Billboard 200 and was eventually certified double platinum by the Recording Industry Association of America; currently, it has sold over 2.3 million copies in the United States alone. Four singles were released from the album: "Out of Control", the title track, "Same Direction", and "Disappear".

Writing and recording
The band entered the studio in 2003 with producer Howard Benson, who has produced records by P.O.D., Cold and The Crystal Method. However, recording was disrupted for a month when guitarist Dan Estrin was seriously injured in a minibike accident in August. Estrin had recovered by October and the band headed off on a Nokia Unwired Tour with the All-American Rejects and Ozomatli in November.

Lyricist and vocalist Doug Robb said in a biography on the band's website that several songs on the album are about questioning what you are told. "A lot of it is about asking questions or questioning all that people see. It's not all about religion. "Out of Control" is about that and about opening your eyes after being blinded by being devoted to anything".

Release

Critical reception

The Reason received mixed reviews from critics. Johnny Loftus of AllMusic found the album's teenage poetry and soft-sounding instrumentation too similar to the band's self-titled debut, but found their musicianship more expertly done, concluding that "In the end, The Reason is really a better version of Hoobastank, written and played by more mature versions of Hoobastank." Christian Hoard of Rolling Stone saw promise in the album's opener "Same Direction" but felt it was dragged down by middling sentiment and angst, saying that "Fugazi-esque guitars and memorable melodies occasionally poke through on The Reasons overbearing attack, reminding you of Hoobastank's promise." Jim Farber of Entertainment Weekly credited Hoobastank for crafting a radio-ready Incubus album but concluded that "they’re still just a crummy Hydrox answer to Incubus’ creamy Oreo."

Commercial performance
The first single "Out of Control" was featured on MX Unleashed, and made available for download on the band's website. The song would reach number nine on the U.S. modern rock chart, and number sixteen on the mainstream rock chart. The Reason eventually reached a peak of number three on the Billboard 200, making it the band's highest-charting album in the United States.

The title track was released as a single in the first half of 2004. It became a massive hit worldwide, reaching number two on the Billboard Hot 100, number one on the U.S. and world modern rock charts and number seven in Australia. The song's success pushed the album back into the charts, reaching number three on the Billboard 200. The Reason was also the twenty-fourth best-selling album of 2004.

In popular culture
"Same Direction" is featured as the main soundtrack for Madden NFL 2005. "Just One" is the title track for Top Spin 2 in the US and the Asahi Super Dry beer commercials of Japan in 2007.

Track listing

Personnel
Adapted from the album's liner notes.

Hoobastank
Doug Robb – vocals (all tracks)
Dan Estrin – acoustic guitar (on "What Happened to Us?", "Lucky", "From the Heart", "The Reason", "Unaffected", and "Disappear"), guitars (all tracks)
Markku Lappalainen – bass  (all tracks)
Chris Hesse – drums (all tracks)

Additional musicians
Howard Benson – keyboards (on "What Happened to Us?" and "The Reason")
Sam Fisher – violin (on "Lucky", "The Reason", and "Disappear")
Victor Lawrence – cello (on "Lucky", "The Reason", and "Disappear")
David Low – cello on ("Lucky", "The Reason", and "Disappear")
Deborah Lurie – string arrangements (on "Lucky", "The Reason", and "Disappear")
Rene Mandel – violin (on "Lucky", "The Reason", and "Disappear")
David Mergen – cello (on "Lucky", "The Reason", and "Disappear")
Jamie Oliver – group vocals (on "Out of Control")
Simon Oswell – viola (on "Lucky", "The Reason", and "Disappear")
Mark Robertson – string contractor and violin (on "Lucky", "The Reason", and "Disappear")
Shanti Randall – viola (on "Lucky", "The Reason", and "Disappear")
Michael Valerio – upright bass (on "Lucky", "The Reason", and "Disappear")
Ian Watkins – group vocals (on "Out of Control")
Evan Wilson – viola (on "Lucky", "The Reason", and "Disappear")

Production
Howard Benson – producer
Chris Lord-Alge – mixing
Mike Plotnikoff – mixing (on "Let it Out")

Imagery
Louis Marino – art direction, design, illustrations
Danny Clinch – band photography
RJ Muna – cover photography

Charts

Weekly charts

Year-end charts

Certifications

References

Hoobastank albums
2003 albums
Albums produced by Howard Benson
Island Records albums